James Hadley may refer to:

James Hadley (scholar) (1821–1872), American scholar
James Hadley (potter) (1837–1903), English potter
Jack Hadley (James Roosevelt Hadley, born 1936), American curator
Jim Hadley (1893–1971), Australian politician

See also
James Hadley Billington (1920–2018), American academic
James Hadley Chase (1906–1985), English writer